Felicia Mason (born May 8, 1962) is an African-American novelist and journalist born in Aliquippa, Pennsylvania, United States. She is best known for writing in the romance genre.  Her novel Rhapsody was adapted into a television movie in 2000.

Biography
Mason grew up in Pennsylvania, but her family moved to Virginia when she was a child. Mason received her BA in mass media arts from the Hampton Institute in 1984 and her MA from Ohio State University. Before becoming a writer, she was a staff developmental editor for the Daily Press in Newport News. She currently lives in Yorktown, VA.

Awards
Romantic Times and Affaire de Coeur were both awarded Reviewers Choice Awards for best contemporary ethnic novel in 1995. She was selected by readers as one of top 10 romance authors, 2002, for Body and Soul. In 2001 she was awarded the Emma Award for contribution to Della's House of Style. She was named best romance writer turned mainstream by Black Issues Book Review in 2002, for Testimony.

Works

Romance novels
 For the Love of You (also see below), Bet Books (Washington, DC), 1994 
 Body and Soul (also see below), Pinnacle Books (New York, NY), 1995 
 Seduction (also see below), Kensington Books (New York, NY), 1996 
 Rhapsody, Five Star (Unity, ME), 1998 
 Foolish Heart, Pinnacle Books (New York, NY), 1998 
 Forbidden Heart, Arabesque (Washington, DC), 2000 
 Testimony, Dafina Books (New York, NY), 2002 
 Sweet Accord, Steeple Hill Books (Buffalo, NY), 2003 
 Sweet Harmony, Steeple Hill Books (Buffalo, NY), 2004 
 Sweet Devotion, Steeple Hill Books (Buffalo, NY), 2004 
 Enchanted Heart, Dafina (New York, NY), 2004 
 Gabriel's Discovery, Love Inspired (Buffalo, NY), 2004 
 Seductive Hearts (omnibus; contains For the Love of You, Body and Soul, and Seduction), Arabesque (Washington, DC), 2005 
 Hidden Riches, Kensington/Dafina (New York, NY), 2014 
 The Fireman Finds a Wife, Love Inspired (Buffalo, NY), 2014.

Anthologies
 A Valentine Kiss, Arabesque (Washington, DC), 1996 
 Man of the House, Arabesque, 1998 
 Something to Celebrate, Kensington Books (New York, NY), 1999
 Della's House of Style, St. Martin's Press (New York, NY), 2000
 Island Magic, 2000; How Sweet the Sound, Thorndike Press (Farmington Hills, MI), 2005
 Sing to My Heart, Harlequin (Toronto, Ontario, Canada), 2012
 Holiday Dream, Harlequin (Toronto, Ontario, Canada), 2012
 Valentine's Dream, Harlequin (Toronto, Ontario, Canada), 2013
 Love Inspired, Love Inspired (Buffalo, NY), 2014
 This Holiday Magic, Harlequin (New York, NY), 2014.

References

African-American women writers
African-American women journalists
African-American journalists
Living people
1962 births
American romantic fiction writers
Women romantic fiction writers
Writers from Pennsylvania
Writers from Virginia
People from Aliquippa, Pennsylvania
Ohio State University alumni
Hampton University alumni
Journalists from Pennsylvania
African-American writers
21st-century African-American people
21st-century African-American women
20th-century African-American people
20th-century African-American women